1 Timothy 3 is the third chapter of the First Epistle to Timothy in the New Testament of the Christian Bible. The author was traditionally identified as Paul the Apostle since as early as AD 180, although most modern scholars consider the letter pseudepigraphical, perhaps written as late as the first half of the second century AD.

This chapter refers to the offices of bishop (or overseer) and deacon, a note about Paul's travel plans, and a formulaic presentation of "the mystery of our religion".

Text

The original text was written in Koine Greek. This chapter has been divided into 16 verses.

Textual witnesses
Some early manuscripts containing the text of this chapter are:
Papyrus 133 (200–300; extant verses 3:13–4:8)
Codex Sinaiticus (AD 330–360)
Codex Alexandrinus (400–440)
Codex Ephraemi Rescriptus (c. 450; extant verses 10–16)
Codex Freerianus (c. 450; extant verses 1, 9–13)
Uncial 061 (c. 450; extant verses 15–16)
Codex Claromontanus (c. 550)
Codex Coislinianus (c. 550; extant verses 7–16)

There has been some claims that the Dead Sea Scrolls contain fragments of Timothy (such as: 7Q4 contains verse 3:16) and other Christian Greek scriptures, but this is rejected by the majority of scholars.

The office of bishop (3:1–7)
This section indicates that at this time the Christian church already 'reached a settled situation, where it needs capable and dignified men to run it' in the position of "overseer" or "bishop".

Verse 1
This is a faithful saying: If a man desires the position of a bishop, he desires a good work.
"This is a faithful saying": is a formula assuming 'general acceptance' and is stated 5 times in the Pastoral Epistles (1 Timothy 1:15; 3:1; 4:9; 2 Timothy 2:11; Titus 3:8). Some authorities relate these words to the latter part of chapter 2, and Clare Drury observes that "it is not quite clear" whether they should be linked back to the previous material and to the material which follows.
"Bishop" (Greek: episkopos): literally "overseer". Protestant theologian Heinrich Meyer avoids reading "desire" (oregetai) as "ambitious striving", noting that the sense "may indeed be ambition, but it may also be the zeal of faith and love".

The Church's Great Confession (3:14–16)

Verse 15
if I am delayed, you may know how one ought to behave in the household of God, which is the church of the living God, the pillar and bulwark of the truth.

In his Commentary on John, while talking about the cleansing of the Temple, Origen mentions the Temple as "the house of the living God, the pillar and bulwark of the truth", referring to the Church which provides firmness. Clark H. Pinnock uses this verse to say that the view that God raising up Church leaders to protect and interpret the Bible is "good and scriptural". He argues that in the Apostolic Age itself there were heretics misinterpreting the truth, and the Church as "the pillar and bulwark of the truth" had to take action against them.

Citing Lesslie Newbigin, who says that the Church confessing the mystery of the faith is "the pillar and bulwark of the truth", Brian Stanley says, "The church herself, as the body of Christ, ... is the only missiologically effective 'hermeneutic of the gospel', bearing witness with 'proper confidence' (a favourite phrase of Newbigin's) to the revelation she has received."

Linking with ecclesial authority, the Eastern Orthodox Church uses this verse to state that the Church (Ekklēsia) proclaims and protects divine truths, both written (Scripture) and unwritten (Tradition), "which coexist in complete harmony with each other". Peter Kreeft gives his summary: "The Bible appeals to the authority of Tradition and Tradition appeals to the authority of the Bible. The Bible calls the Church "the pillar and bulwark of the truth" (1 Timothy 3:15), and the Church calls the Bible infallible divine revelation."

Though there are disagreements on the exercise of teaching authority, the Evangelicals and Catholics Together (ECT) participants cites this verse and share their agreement in Your Word Is Truth:

Verse 16

The New King James Version of verse 16 reads:
 And without controversy great is the mystery of godliness:
 God was manifested in the flesh,
 Justified in the Spirit,
 Seen by angels,
 Preached among the Gentiles,
 Believed on in the world,
 Received up in glory.
 "Mystery of godliness": which is the incarnation of Jesus Christ, involving his birth of a virgin, the union of the two natures, divine and human, in his person.
 "God was manifest in the flesh": that is the second Person, the Word, or Son of God (cf. ) who existed as a divine Person, and as a distinct one from the Father and Spirit. This clause is a very apt and full interpretation of the word "Moriah", the name of the mount in which Jehovah would manifest himself, and be seen.
 "Received up into glory": Jesus was raised from the dead, had a glory on his risen body and ascended in a glorious manner to heaven, is set down at his right hand, and crowned with glory and honor, that he had with him before the world was.

In An Historical Account of Two Notable Corruptions of Scripture, published posthumously in 1754, Isaac Newton argues that a small change to early Greek versions of this verse effectively changed "which" (referring to godliness) to "God". This change increases textual support for trinitarianism, a doctrine to which Newton did not subscribe. There is evidence that the original Greek read 'ος' but was modified by the addition of a strikethrough to become 'θς' (see the excerpt from the Codex Sinaiticus, above). 'θς' was then assumed to be a contraction of 'θεος'. Biblical scholar Bruce Metzger notes that "no uncial (in the first hand) earlier than the eighth or ninth century (Ψ) supports θεος; all ancient versions presuppose ὃς or ὃ; and no patristic writer prior to the last third of the fourth century testifies to the reading of θεος." The New American Bible Revised Edition, which reads the wording as a reference to Christ, notes that

See also
 Bishop
 Deacon
 Jesus Christ
 Presbyter

 Related Bible parts: Titus 1

References

Sources

External links
 King James Bible - Wikisource
English Translation with Parallel Latin Vulgate
Online Bible at GospelHall.org (ESV, KJV, Darby, American Standard Version, Bible in Basic English)
Multiple bible versions at Bible Gateway (NKJV, NIV, NRSV etc.)

03